The following lists events that happened during 1850 in New Zealand.

Population
The estimated population of New Zealand at the end of 1850 is 65,650 Māori and 22,108 non-Māori.

Incumbents

Regal and viceregal
Head of State – Queen Victoria
Governor – Sir George Grey

Government and law
Chief Justice – William Martin
Lieutenant Governor, New Munster – Edward John Eyre
Lieutenant Governor, New Ulster – George Dean Pitt

Events 
16 December – The Charlotte-Jane, one of the First Four Ships bringing settlers to Canterbury arrives in Lyttelton Harbour followed by the Randolph later the same afternoon.
17 December – The George Seymour arrives in Lyttelton.
21 December – Otago News finishes publication. The newspaper started in 1848.
27 December – The Cressy is the last of the First Four Ships to arrive at Lyttelton.

Foundations
 St Mary's Seminary

Births 
 7 January: Joseph James Fletcher, Australian biologist (d. 1926)
 8 April: Thomas Hislop, Mayor of Wellington (in Scotland)

Deaths
 7 August: Hone Heke, tribal leader
 15 October: William Darby Brind, master mariner and whaler (probable date of death)

Unknown date
Te Rohu, tribal leader
Rawiri Tareahi, tribal leader

See also
List of years in New Zealand
Timeline of New Zealand history
History of New Zealand
Military history of New Zealand
Timeline of the New Zealand environment
Timeline of New Zealand's links with Antarctica

References

External links